Diatonica is a genus of moth in the family Cosmopterigidae. It contains only one species, Diatonica macrogramma, which is found in Australia, where it has been recorded from Victoria.

References

External links
Natural History Museum Lepidoptera genus database

Cosmopteriginae